Following are public artworks installed in Ashland, Oregon, United States:

 Ashland Streetscape and Hills by Nicole Shulters (2012)
 Butler-Perozzi Fountain (1915), marble
 Carter Memorial Fountain (1910), features the statue Pioneer Mike
 Ceramic Frieze by Susan Springer (2013)
 Compass Rose by Susan Springer (2011)
 Cubs at Play by Sarah Mayer (2003), bronze
 Elevation by Cheryl Garcia (2018), steel
 Ethel E. Reid by Thomas Knudsen (1973), bronze
 Fall Splendor by Annette Julien (2015)
 Gift (2009)
 Inorganic Compound by Kevin Christman (2009)
 Las Calles de Guatajuato (2016), mural
 Mickelson-Chapman Fountain (1929)
 Nourishing Our Community by Lonnie Feather (2006), basalt and glass
 Open Minded by CJ Rench (2013), steel
 Pacific Fisher by Jeremy Crisswell (2015), ceramic mosaic and steel
 Pathway to Goodness and Light (2009), painted panels
 Peace Fence (2010)
 Rio Amistad by Susan Springer (2005), ceramic and glass mosaic
 Seasons of Gratitude by Denise Baxter (2014)
 Statue of Abraham Lincoln
 Street Scene by Marion Young (1993), bronze
 Threshold by Susan Zoccola (2018)
 Velocity by Gordon Huether (2018)
 Water Is Life by Karen Rycheck (2017), mosaic cairn
 We Are Here

References

Ashland, Oregon
Ashland
 
Ashland, Oregon